Carposina scierotoxa is a moth in the Carposinidae family. It is found in Uganda.

References

Natural History Museum Lepidoptera generic names catalog

Endemic fauna of Uganda
Carposinidae
Moths of Africa
Moths described in 1924